Santa Rosa CityBus is a public transportation agency providing bus service in the northern California city of Santa Rosa. It provides service for over 2.8 million passenger trips annually.

Routes
A total of 18 routes are operated by Santa Rosa CityBus, most of them operating in loops (usually in a clockwise direction). Note that streets and areas indicated in italics means that the area is served by a one-way loop, not a return service.

On May 21, 2017, Santa Rosa City Bus was scheduled to adjust its network significantly as a result of the agency's Reimagining Project, held in collaboration with the City of Santa Rosa and its residents.

The routes below are valid since May 2017.

15-minute service on entire route.
15-minute service for a section of this route.
15-minute service where combined with route 5.
15-minute service where combined with route 3.
Operates on weekdays only.
Route 9E operates during school bell times only.
Route 10 Round Barn Blvd. loop operates on weekdays only.
Route 7 and 19 don't operate due to COVID-19 pandemic.

Transit Mall and transfer centers

The downtown Transit Mall, a segment of Second Street between Santa Rosa Avenue and B Street, is the main transfer point for several bus agencies, including Sonoma County Transit, Golden Gate Transit, and Mendocino Transit Authority, and most CityBus routes begin and end their trips there.

In May 2000, the city opened the Westside Transfer Center as an additional transfer point, where Routes 3, 6, and 15 make stops. There are also several transfer centers within the city, including:

 Northside Transfer Center - at Range Avenue & Steele Lane, near Coddingtown Mall. Transfer point for Routes 1, 6, 7, 10, 15, and 19.
 Eastside Transfer Center - at Sonoma Avenue & Farmers Lane, across Montgomery Village. Transfer point for Routes 4, 4B, 7, 8, and 18.
 Southside Transfer Center - at Hearn Avenue & Burbank Avenue, near Roseland. Transfer point for Routes 12 and 15.
 Westside Transfer Center - at Stony Point Road & W College Avenue, near Finley Community Center. Transfer point for Routes 9, 15, and 19.

Fleet

Active

Retired
This roster is incomplete.

Paratransit

Santa Rosa Paratransit, the paratransit arm of Santa Rosa CityBus and the city of Santa Rosa, provides dial-a-ride (i.e. curb to curb) transportation services within the Santa Rosa city limits and the unincorporated Roseland area. Eligibility requirements require the passenger's disability prevents him/her from using fixed route transit (Santa Rosa CityBus or other transit systems). MV Transportation is the contractor of all paratransit services in Santa Rosa.

One of CityBus' routes, Route 16 (Oakmont Shuttles), picks up Oakmont residents who are ADA Paratransit Certified at their homes for free to take them to and from locations within Oakmont. It also lets residents to get a ride home for free as well. They can go on the daily shopping trips to:
 Mondays, Wednesdays and Fridays - St. Francis Center (Safeway)
 Tuesdays - Montgomery Village
 Wednesdays - Montecito Shopping Center (Oliver’s Market) 
 Thursdays - CVS Pharmacy (Farmer’s Lane)

It works as the Route 16 bus that serves Oakmont. However, as the bus travels along its regular route, it simply makes small detours to pick up ADA Paratransit Certified Oakmont residents at their homes, and then return to the regular route.

Reservations are accepted up to seven days in advance or between 8:00 and 10:00 a.m. on the same day as the ride. Reservations are scheduled on a first-come, first-served basis.

References

External links
 Official website

Bus transportation in California
Transportation in Santa Rosa, California
Public transportation in Sonoma County, California